John Younger (1851–1874) was an American outlaw.

John Younger may also refer to:
John Younger (writer) (1785–1860), writer, shoemaker, and poet
Sir John David Bingham Younger, Lord Lieutenant of Tweeddale 
John Younger (priest), Dean of Salisbury
John Younger (rower), American rower in the 1985 World Rowing Championships

See also

John the Younger (disambiguation)